Carlo Buscaglia (9 February 1909 – 15 August 1981) was an Italian footballer from Bastia di Balocco in the Province of Vercelli who played as a midfielder.

Career
Buscaglia played club football most notably for Napoli. He spent a decade at Napoli, also serving as the team's captain, and wrote himself into the appearance records books at the club; today he is sixth in the club's all-time appearance records for the league.

After leaving Napoli in 1938, he spent two year spells at Juventus and Savona.

References

1909 births
1981 deaths
Italian footballers
Serie A players
Casale F.B.C. players
Juventus F.C. players
S.S.C. Napoli players
Savona F.B.C. players
Footballers from Piedmont
Association football midfielders
Sportspeople from the Province of Vercelli